Ingleside is a historic house at 500 Mica Road in Henry County, Virginia, north of Ridgeway.  It is a two-story wood-frame house with a mix of Greek and Gothic Revival features.  It has a basically square shape, with three bays divided by vertical boards that resemble pilasters.  Its gables are adorned with Gothic scalloped vergeboard.  Its interiors include distinctive painted finishes, include a fireplace mantel painted to resemble gold-veined black marble.  The house is believed to have been built in the 1870s by a member of the Penn family, who were recorded as the landowners in the late 1870s.

The house was listed on the National Register of Historic Places in 1999.

See also
National Register of Historic Places listings in Henry County, Virginia

References

Houses on the National Register of Historic Places in Virginia
National Register of Historic Places in Henry County, Virginia
Gothic Revival architecture in Virginia
Houses completed in 1880
Buildings and structures in Henry County, Virginia